Urzhar (Úrjar) is a village in the Urzhar river valley and the administrative center of Urzhar District in the Abai Region of Kazakhstan. Population:

Notable residents

Almat Kebispayev (born 1987) - Kazakh wrestler, winner of the world championships, champion of Asia.
Dias Keneshev (born 1981) - Kazakh biathlete, champion of the Asian Games - 2011
Oxana Yatskaya (born 1988) - Kazakh cross-country skier, competitor at four Olympic Games, kangokle seven times champion of the Asian Games, Universiade medalist.

References

Populated places in Abai Region